Zhouzhi County is a county under the administration of Xi'an, the capital of Shaanxi province, China. It is the most spacious but least densely populated county-level division of Xi'an, and also contains the city's southernmost and westernmost points. The county borders the prefecture-level cities of Xianyang to the north, Ankang to the southeast, Hanzhong to the southwest, and Baoji to the west, as well as Xi'an's Huyi District to the east. It is famous for kiwifruit, one type of produce in which Shaanxi province excels.
Many of notable historical figures have visited Zhouzhi county, such as Chinese philosopher Laozi (老子), poet Bai Juyi (白居易), and British biochemist Joseph Needham.

There are some claims Yu the Great (大禹) was born in Zhouzhi county hongqi village.

In 1964, the Chinese name of Zhouzhi was changed from '' to its current homophonous name.

Administrative divisions
As 2020, Zhouzhi County is divided to 1 subdistrict and 19 towns.
Subdistricts
 Erqu Subdistrict
Towns

Climate

See also

 Roman Catholic Diocese of Zhouzhi
 Louguantai
 Daqin Pagoda

References

External links

County-level divisions of Shaanxi
Geography of Xi'an